Municipalities ( or ) are the second-level administrative divisions of Albania, below counties and above administrative units or communes. Since the most recent administrative reforms in 2014, Albania has 61 municipalities.

History
Municipalities are considered the basic administrative division of Albania. Since its Declaration of Independence from the Ottoman Empire in 1912, Albania has reorganized internal administration 21 times. From independence until the year 2000, regional government was organized into regions of varing numbers, size, and importance. They were consolidated into groups comprising 12 counties in 1991. Following the 1998 constitutional reforms, the 36 regions of the time were abolished entirely and replaced by the larger counties and two kinds of municipalities: urban municipalities and rural ones. In 2014, this was revised to reduce the number of urban municipalities to 61 and extended their jurisdiction over the surrounding countryside to create regional administrations, while using the communesrenamed administrative unitsas a third-level division for local government. This first took effect in the 2015 local elections.

List

References 

 
Government of Albania
Albania geography-related lists
Albania
Subdivisions of Albania
Municipalities, Albania